Zhuo is the Mandarin pinyin romanization of the Chinese surname written  in Chinese character. It is romanized Cho in Wade–Giles, Cheuk or Cherk or Chak in Cantonese, and Toh or Tok in Teochew and Hokkien. Zhuo is listed 277th in the Song dynasty classic text Hundred Family Surnames. As of 2008, it is the 224th most common surname in China, shared by 360,000 people.

Notable people
 Zhuo Wenjun (2nd century BC), celebrated poet, wife of Sima Xiangru
 Zhuo Jing (卓敬; died 1402), Ming dynasty minister, executed for refusing to serve the Yongle Emperor
 Zhuo Bingtian (卓秉恬; 1782–1855), Qing dynasty Minister of Defense
 Toh Ah Boon or Zhuo Yawen (1860–1932), Malayan businessman
 Zhuo Lin (1916–2009), wife of Deng Xiaoping
 Toh Kian Chui (卓键水) (1927-2000), Singaporean philanthropist
 Zhuo Renxi (1931–2019), chemist, academician of the Chinese Academy of Sciences
 Alfred Y. Cho or Zhuo Yihe (born 1937), Chinese-American electrical engineer
 Patsy Toh or Zhuo Yilong (born 1940), pianist, Fellow of the Royal Academy of Music
 Zhuo Changren (卓长仁; 1948–2001), Chinese aircraft hijacker and murderer in Taiwan
 Cho Sheng-li (卓勝利; 1949–2012), Taiwanese actor
 H. T.  Cho or Zhuo Huotu (卓火土; born 1950), cofounder and former CEO of HTC
 Zhuo Xinping (卓新平; born 1955), scholar of religions, academician of Chinese Academy of Social Sciences
 Cho Jung-tai (born 1959), Taiwanese politician, Chairman-elect of the Democratic Progressive Party
 Cheuk Wan-chi or Zhuo Yunzhi (born 1979), Hong Kong media personality
 Timi Zhuo or Zhuo Yi-ting (born 1981), Taiwanese singer
 Toh Guo'An or Zhuo Guo'an (born 1982), Singaporean football player
 Genie Chuo or Zhuo Wenxuan (born 1986), Taiwanese singer
 Murder of the Zhuo family, a Chinese-American family who were murdered by a cousin in 2013
Took Leng How (卓良豪; 1981-2006), a Malaysian and convicted murderer who was hanged in Singapore for the murder of 8-year-old Huang Na.
Toh Hong Huat (卓鸿发; born 1974, disappeared in 1986), a twelve-year-old schoolboy who went missing in Singapore
Toh Sia Guan (卓谢源; born 1952), a homeless Singaporean who murdered a coffee shop worker during a fight at a Geylang kopi tiam

References

Chinese-language surnames
Individual Chinese surnames